Au revoir les enfants (meaning "Goodbye, Children") is an autobiographical 1987 film written, produced and directed by Louis Malle. It is based on the actions of Père Jacques, a French priest and headmaster who attempted to shelter Jewish children during the Holocaust. The film won the Golden Lion at the Venice Film Festival.

Plot
During the winter of 1943–44, Julien Quentin, a student at a Carmelite boarding school in occupied France, is returning to school from vacation. He acts tough to the students at the school, but he is actually a pampered boy who misses his mother deeply. Saddened to be returning to the monotony of boarding school, Julien's classes seem uneventful until Père Jean, the headmaster, introduces three new pupils. One of them, Jean Bonnet, is the same age as Julien. Like the other students, Julien at first despises Bonnet, a socially awkward boy with a talent for arithmetic and playing the piano.

One night, Julien wakes up and finds Bonnet wearing a kippah and praying in Hebrew. After digging through his new friend's locker, Julien learns the truth. His real name is not Bonnet, but Jean Kippelstein. Père Jean, a compassionate, sacrificing priest at the school, had agreed to grant secret asylum to hunted Jews. After a game of treasure hunt, however, Julien and Jean bond and a close friendship develops between them.

When Julien's mother visits on Parents' Day, Julien asks his mother if Bonnet, whose parents could not come, could accompany them to lunch at a gourmet restaurant. As they sit around the table, the talk turns to Julien's father, a factory owner. When Julien's brother asks if he is still for Marshal Pétain, Madame Quentin responds, "No one is anymore." However, the Milice arrive and attempt to expel a Jewish diner. When Julien's brother calls them "Collabos", the Milice commander is enraged and tells Madam Quentin, "We serve France, madam. He insulted us." However, when a Wehrmacht officer coldly orders them to leave, the Milice officers grudgingly obey. Julien's mother comments that the Jewish diner appears to be a very distinguished gentleman. She insists that she has nothing against Jews, but would not object if the socialist politician Léon Blum were hanged.

Shortly thereafter, Joseph, the school's assistant cook, is exposed for selling the school's food supplies on the black market. He implicates several students as accomplices, including Julien and his brother, François. Although Père Jean is visibly distressed by the injustice, he fires Joseph but does not expel the students for fear of offending their wealthy and influential parents.

On a cold morning in January 1944, the Gestapo raid the school, searching for Jean Kippelstein. As his classroom is being searched, Julien unintentionally gives away Bonnet by looking in his direction. As the other two Jewish boys are hunted down, Julien encounters the person who denounced them, Joseph the kitchen hand. Trying to justify his betrayal in the face of Julien's mute disbelief, Joseph tells him, "Don't act so pious. There's a war going on, kid." Disgusted, Julien runs off. Jean and Julien exchange books, a shared habit of theirs, as they pack away their belongings due to the closure of the school.

As the students are lined up in the school courtyard, a Gestapo officer denounces Père Jean's actions and further accuses all French people of being weak and undisciplined. Meanwhile, Père Jean and the three Jewish students are led away by the officers. Père Jean shouts: "Au revoir, les enfants! À bientôt!" to the children and they respond: "Au revoir, mon père!" As they leave the grounds, Jean glances over towards Julien briefly, and he waves in return.

The film ends with an older Julien providing a voiceover epilogue, in which he mentions that Bonnet, Negus and Dupre died at Auschwitz, whereas Père Jean died at Mauthausen; the school later reopened in October. He explains that although more than 40 years have passed, he will remember every second of that January morning until the day he dies.

Cast
 Gaspard Manesse as Julien Quentin
 Raphaël Fejtő as Jean Kippelstein, alias "Jean Bonnet"
 Francine Racette as Mme Quentin (Julien's mother)
 Stanislas Carré de Malberg as François Quentin (Julien's older brother)
 Philippe Morier-Genoud as Father Jean/Père Jean
 François Berléand as Father Michel/Père Michel
 Irène Jacob as Mlle Davenne
 François Négret as Joseph (kitchen helper)
 Peter Fitz as Dr. Müller
 Pascal Rivet as Boulanger
 Benoît Henriet as Ciron
 Richard Leboeuf as Sagard
 Xavier Legrand as Babinot
 Arnaud Henriet as Negus
 Damien Salot as Dupre

Actual events
The film is based on events in the childhood of the director, Louis Malle, who at age 11 was attending a Roman Catholic boarding school near Fontainebleau. One day, he witnessed a Gestapo raid in which three Jewish students and a Jewish teacher were rounded up and deported to Auschwitz.  The school's headmaster, Père Jacques, was arrested for harboring them and sent to the concentration camp at Mauthausen. He died shortly after the camp was liberated by the U.S. Army, having refused to leave until the last French prisoner was repatriated. Forty years later Yad Vashem, Israel's official memorial to the victims of the Holocaust, granted Père Jacques the title of Righteous Among the Nations.

Reception
The film was extremely well received by critics and has a 97% "Fresh" rating at the review aggregator site Rotten Tomatoes based on 37 reviews, with the consensus: "Louis Malle's autobiographical tale of a childhood spent in a WWII boarding school is a beautifully realized portrait of friendship and youth."

The film was also a box office success having 3.5 million admissions in France and grossing $4,542,825 in North America.

The screenplay was published by Gallimard in the same year.

Awards nominations
Academy Awards
 Best Foreign Language Film - Nominated
 Best Original Screenplay (Louis Malle) - Nominated

Golden Globe Awards
 Best Foreign Language Film - Nominated

British Academy Film Awards
 Best Film (Louis Malle) - Nominated
 Best Film Not in the English Language - Nominated
 Best Direction (Louis Malle) - Won
 Best Original Screenplay (Louis Malle) - Nominated

César Awards
 Best Film (Louis Malle) - Won
 Best Director (Louis Malle) - Won
 Most Promising Actor (François Négret) - Nominated
 Best Writing (Louis Malle) - Won
 Best Cinematography (Renato Berta) - Won
 Best Production Design (Willy Holt) - Won
 Best Costume Design (Corinne Jorry) - Nominated
 Best Editing (Emmanuelle Castro) - Won
 Best Sound (Jean-Claude Laureux, Bernard Le Roux and Claude Villand) - Won

David di Donatello Awards
 Best Foreign Film (Louis Malle) - Won

According to Quentin Tarantino, the title for his first feature-length film, Reservoir Dogs (1992), came about after a patron at a Video Archives rental store, where Tarantino worked, misheard his film suggestion of Au revoir les enfants as "reservoir dogs".

See also
 List of submissions to the 60th Academy Awards for Best Foreign Language Film
 List of French submissions for the Academy Award for Best Foreign Language Film

References

External links
 
 
 
 Au Revoir les Enfants screenplay at Google Books
 Au revoir les enfants: Childhood's End an essay by Philip Kemp at the Criterion Collection

1980s war drama films
1987 films
Films about Catholicism
Films about the French Resistance
Films directed by Louis Malle
Best Film César Award winners
Films whose director won the Best Direction BAFTA Award
Films whose director won the Best Director César Award
French coming-of-age films
French war drama films
1980s French-language films
Golden Lion winners
Holocaust films
Louis Delluc Prize winners
The Holocaust in France
West German films
1987 drama films
Films set in boarding schools
Rescue of Jews during the Holocaust
1980s French films